Enrique Ramos Rodríguez (24 November 1932 – 19 June 2017) was a Mexican politician from the Institutional Revolutionary Party. He has served as Deputy of the LVI and LVIII Legislatures of the Mexican Congress representing Veracruz.

References

1932 births
2017 deaths
Politicians from Veracruz
People from Córdoba, Veracruz
Institutional Revolutionary Party politicians
21st-century Mexican politicians
Deputies of the LVIII Legislature of Mexico
Members of the Chamber of Deputies (Mexico) for Veracruz